The Lakes of Covadonga (el. 1134 m.) are composed of two glacial lakes located on the region of Asturias, Spain. These lakes, often also called Lakes of Enol or simply Los Lagos, are Lake Enol and Lake Ercina located in the Picos de Europa range and they are the original center of the Picos de Europa National Park, created in 1918. They are near Covadonga Sanctuary.

Vuelta a España
The road ascending from Covadonga to the lakes is a popular climb in professional road bicycle racing, having been used by Vuelta a España many times in the last 25 years.

Together with Alto de l'Angliru, Lagos de Covadonga is the most important climb in the modern history of the Vuelta. The road that leads to the lakes starts at Covadonga and is 12.6 kilometres long at an average gradient of 7.3% (height gain: 1056 m). The most demanding section is La Huesera, 7 kilometres from the top of the climb, with an average gradient of 15% during 800 meters. It was featured for the first time in 1983 with the victory of Marino Lejarreta, who was in a fierce battle with Bernard Hinault for overall victory. This was the same Vuelta that saw Hinault, Greg LeMond and Laurent Fignon all riding on the same team.

Winners of the Lakes of Covadonga stage

External links
 Lagos de Covadonga climb details 
 Information and profile of the Covadonga by Climbbybike.com
 Cycling up to Lagos de Covadonga: data, profile, map, photos and description

Climbs in cycle racing in Spain
Picos de Europa
Covadonga